Zemeș is a commune in Bacău County, Western Moldavia, Romania. It is composed of two villages, Bolătău and Zemeș.

References

Communes in Bacău County
Localities in Western Moldavia